Borane tert-butylamine is an amine borane complex derived from tert-butylamine and borane. It is a colorless solid.

The compound is prepared by the reaction of tert-butylammonium chloride and sodium borohydride:
t-BuNH3Cl  +  NaBH4   →   t-BuNH2BH3  +  H2  +  NaCl

In organic synthesis, borane tert-butylamine can be used for selective reduction of certain functional groups including aldehydes, ketones, oximes, and imines.

In photographic processing, it is used in the E-4 process, as "chemical enlighting" step in the processing of the film.

See also 
 Ammonia borane

References

Boranes
Boron–nitrogen compounds
Reagents for organic chemistry
Tert-butyl compounds